Donald Kenyon (15 May 1924 – 12 November 1996) was an English first-class cricketer, who played in eight Tests for England from 1951 to 1955. He captained Worcestershire between 1959 and 1967.

Cricket writer, Colin Bateman, noted, "A polished batsman who relished taking on fast bowlers, he became the heaviest scorer in Worcestershire's history with more than 37,000 first-class runs to his credit".

Life and career
Kenyon was born in Wordsley, Staffordshire on 15 May 1924, and lived most of his adult life in nearby Wollaston, West Midlands. He played all his county cricket for Worcestershire, but when international opportunities came along, Kenyon was unable to produce his run-making abilities on the highest stage. He fell in single figures in eleven of his fifteen England innings, although his Test career was rather sporadic in nature.  Kenyon played three Tests on the 1951/52 tour to India, two more in 1953, with three more appearances in 1955, but life in the fast lane did not seem to suit his temperament.

He was a popular and successful captain of his county, and went on in his later life to become an England Test selector, and president of his beloved county side.

Kenyon died in November 1996, in Worcester, at the age of 72.

References

1924 births
1996 deaths
England Test cricketers
English cricketers
Worcestershire cricketers
Worcestershire cricket captains
Combined Services cricketers
Royal Air Force cricketers
International Cavaliers cricketers
Wisden Cricketers of the Year
England cricket team selectors
Players cricketers
Marylebone Cricket Club cricketers
North v South cricketers
20th-century British businesspeople